Norddeich may refer to:

 Norddeich (Dithmarschen), a municipality in the district of Dithmarschen, Schleswig-Holstein, Germany
 Norddeich (Norden), a seaside resort in the district of Norden, East Frisia, Germany
 Norddeich Mole railway station, Norden
 Norddeich radio station, Norden
 Norddeich railway station, Norden